The 2005–06 Iowa State Cyclones men's basketball team represents Iowa State University during the 2005–06 NCAA Division I men's basketball season. The Cyclones were coached by Wayne Morgan, who was in his 3rd season. They played their home games at Hilton Coliseum in Ames, Iowa and competed in the Big 12 Conference.

Previous season

The Cyclones finished 19-12, 9-7 in Big 12 play to finish 5th the regular season conference standings.  They lost to Texas Tech in the quarterfinals of the Big 12 tournament.  They received an at-large bid to the NCAA tournament where they defeated Minnesota and lost to North Carolina.

Offseason departures

Recruiting

Roster

Schedule and results

|-
!colspan=12 style=""|Exhibition
|-

|-

|-
!colspan=12 style=""|Regular Season
|-

|-

|-

|-

|-

|-

|-

|-

|-

|-

|-

|-

|-

|-

|-

|-

|-

|-

|-

|-

|-

|-

|-

|-

|-

|-

|-

|-

|-

|-
!colspan=12 style=""|Big 12 Tournament
|-

|-

Awards and honors

All-Conference Selections

Curtis Stinson (1st Team)
Will Blalock (3rd Team)

Ralph A. Olsen Award

Curtis Stinson (2006)
Will Blalock (2006)

References

Iowa State Cyclones men's basketball seasons
Iowa State
Iowa State Cyc
Iowa State Cyc